Hedriodiscus trivittatus is a species of soldier fly in the family Stratiomyidae.

Distribution
United States, Colombia, Dominican Republic, El Salvador, Guatemala, Mexico.

References

Stratiomyidae
Insects described in 1829
Taxa named by Thomas Say
Diptera of South America
Diptera of North America